Aaadonta irregularis is a species of snail, a terrestrial pulmonate gastropod mollusk in the family Endodontidae. It is endemic to Palau, where it was only known from Peleliu, but has only been found recently on the very small island of Omekang. It is threatened by the destruction and modification of its tropical moist lowland forest habitat.

References

Endodontoid land snails from Pacific Islands (Mollusca : Pulmonata : Sigmurethra). Alan Solem ... ; [collab.] Barbara K. Solem. Chicago, Ill. :Field Museum of Natural History,1976.
Endodontoid land snails from Pacific Islands (Mollusca : Pulmonata : Sigmurethra). Alan Solem. Chicago :Field museum of Natural History,1982.

Endemic fauna of Palau
Gastropods described in 1874
Endodontidae